John Barth was an American politician, born on December 28, 1826, in Germany. He moved to Ozaukee County, Wisconsin in 1853.

A Democrat, Barth represented the First District of Manitowoc County, Wisconsin in the Wisconsin State Assembly. He was Treasurer, Supervisor, Assessor, Chairman of Town Supervisors and Chairman of Schleswig, Wisconsin. In 1868, he lost a bid for Supervisor of Manitowoc County.

References

German emigrants to the United States
People from Ozaukee County, Wisconsin
People from Manitowoc County, Wisconsin
Democratic Party members of the Wisconsin State Assembly
1826 births
Year of death missing